Scrivener Glacier is a small tributary glacier flowing southeast to the north side of Mackay Glacier, immediately west of Mount Allan Thomson in Victoria Land. It was charted and named by the British Antarctic Expedition, 1910–13.

Glaciers of Scott Coast